Richard Nash Elliott (April 25, 1873 – March 21, 1948) was an American lawyer and politician who served seven terms as a U.S. Representative from Indiana from 1917 to 1931.

Early life and career 
Born near Connersville, Indiana, Elliott attended the common schools.
He taught school for three years.
He studied law.
He was admitted to the bar in 1896.
He was a lawyer in private practice.
County attorney of Fayette County, Indiana from 1897 to 1906.

Political career 
He served as member of the Indiana House of Representatives from 1905 to 1909.
City attorney of Connersville, 1905-1909.
He served as delegate to the Republican National Convention, 1916.
He served as chair of the Republican State convention in 1930.

Congress 
Elliott was elected as a Republican to the Sixty-fifth Congress to fill the vacancy caused by the death of United States Representative Daniel W. Comstock.
He was reelected to the Sixty-sixth and to the five succeeding Congresses (June 29, 1917 – March 3, 1931).
He served as chair of the Committee on Expenditures in the Department of State (Sixty-sixth and Sixty-seventh Congresses), Committee on Elections No. 3 (Sixty-eighth Congress), Committee on Public Buildings and Grounds (Sixty-ninth through Seventy-first Congresses).
He was an unsuccessful candidate for reelection to the Seventy-second Congress in 1930.

Later career and death 
He served as assistant comptroller general of the United States, 1931–1943.

He died on March 21, 1948, in Washington, D.C.
He was interred in Dale Cemetery, Connersville, Indiana.

References

External links 
 

1873 births
1948 deaths
People from Connersville, Indiana
Republican Party members of the Indiana House of Representatives
Republican Party members of the United States House of Representatives from Indiana